Daniel Ramirez Fernando (born Cesar Fernando Ramirez; May 12, 1962) is a Filipino actor and politician who is the 34th and incumbent Governor of Bulacan.

Fernando formerly worked as an actor in film and television. Fernando is critically acclaimed for his performance in the 1985 controversial erotic thriller film Scorpio Nights, directed by Peque Gallaga and produced by Lily Monteverde of Regal Films.

Political career

2019 gubernatorial bid 

Fernando announced he would run for governor under NUP, following after Wilhelmino Sy-Alvarado, the incumbent governor, who is term-limited and became his running mate. On May 13, 2019, Fernando was elected governor, defeating the Malolos mayor Christian "Agila" Natividad and former councilor Teddy "Aguila" Natividad.

2022 gubernatorial re-election 

Fernando successfully ran for re-election to a second term under National Unity Party (NUP) in 2022, including his running mate for vice governor is provincial board Alex Castro. He defeated vice-governor Wilhelmino Sy-Alvarado in the general election on May 9, 2022, in a big landslide of the vote.

Filmography

Film

Television

References

External links
 

1962 births
Living people
20th-century Filipino male actors
Filipino actor-politicians
Male actors from Bulacan
Members of the Bulacan Provincial Board
National Unity Party (Philippines) politicians
Liberal Party (Philippines) politicians
Lakas–CMD politicians
Filipino male television actors
Kapampangan people
University of the East alumni
21st-century Filipino male actors
Filipino male film actors
Governors of Bulacan
GMA Network personalities
ABS-CBN personalities